Events from the year 1761 in Sweden

Incumbents
 Monarch – Adolf Frederick

Events

 5 February – Anders Johan von Höpken steps down as President of the Privy Council Chancellery.
 10 April – Claes Ekeblad appointed Privy Council Chancellery.
 - Axel von Fersen the Elder becomes leader of the Hats (party), and issue negotiations with Queen Louisa Ulrika to bring about the end of Sweden's involvement in the war through mediation with her brother Frederick the Great. 
 
 
 

 - Catherine Charlotte De la Gardie is officially awarded with a medal for having prevented a witch trial.

Births

 
 
 
 Caroline Gother, banker  (died 1836) 
 
 29 November - Hedvig Ulrika De la Gardie, courtier  (died 1832)

Deaths

 
 
 2 June - Jonas Alströmer,  pioneer of agriculture and industry  (born 1685) 
 
 
 Cecilia Elisabeth Würzer, singer

References

 
Years of the 18th century in Sweden
Sweden